Võ Duy Nam (born 15 May 1986 or 28 June 1986) is a Vietnamese footballer. He plays for Hồ Chí Minh City which is playing in V-League.

He was called to Vietnam national under-23 football team to attend 2007 SEA Games.

Then, was called to Vietnam national football team at the friendly matches against China PR, Hong Kong and Mozambique.

References

External links 
 
  Profile

1986 births
Living people
People from Khánh Hòa Province
Vietnamese footballers
Association football midfielders
Vietnam international footballers
Hanoi FC players
Thanh Hóa FC players
V.League 1 players